Weon Jong-teok (born August 16, 1977) is a South Korean football player who played for FC Seoul (formerly Anyang LG Cheetahs). He was goalkeeper coach for FC Seoul Youth team-Dongbuk High School FC.

Honours

Player
FC Seoul
 K League Winners (1) : 2000
 K League Runners-up (1) : 2001

References

External links
 

Living people
1977 births
FC Seoul players
Korean Police FC (Semi-professional) players
South Korean footballers
FC Seoul non-playing staff
Hongik University alumni
People from Changwon
Association football goalkeepers
Sportspeople from South Gyeongsang Province